South Portland Bus Service is a municipally-owned suburban provider of mass transportation. Because the city of South Portland opted out of the Greater Portland Transit District, this community runs its own separate three-route bus service. Two routes serve major shopping areas and loop through major residential streets, funneling residents locally and giving them access to downtown Portland. A third route provides access to Willard Beach and Southern Maine Community College, with all three routes going to downtown Portland.

Route list
21 Willard Square/SMCC
24A Maine Mall via Main Street
24B Maine Mall via Community Center

External links
 South Portland Bus Service (official web site)

Bus transportation in Maine
South Portland, Maine
Transit agencies in Maine